Gleb, Hleb or Hlib is a Slavic male given name derived from the Old Norse name Guðleifr, which means "heir of god." According to another version, the name Gleb comes from the name Olaf. It is popular in Russia due to an early martyr, Saint Gleb, who is venerated by Eastern Orthodox churches. It is also commonly used in Ukraine. Notable people with the name include:

People
Gleb of Kiev (died 1171), Rus’ prince
Gleb Axelrod (1923–2003), Russian pianist
Gleb Baklanov (1910–1976), Russian general
Gleb Boglayevskiy (born 1986), Russian football player
Gleb Botkin (1900-1969), Russian-born American memoirist, illustrator and founder of a neo-pagan religion who was the son of Eugene Botkin, the court physician to the Romanov family
Gleb W. Derujinsky (1888–1975), Russian-American sculptor
Gleb Galperin (born 1985), Russian diver
Gleb Ilyin (1889–1968), Russian-American painter
Gleb Kotelnikov (1872–1944), Russian inventor
Gleb Krotkov (1901–1968), Canadian scientist
Gleb Krzhizhanovsky (1872–1959), Russian economist
Gleb Lozino-Lozinskiy (1909–2001), Russian engineer
Gleb Vladimirovich Nosovsky (born 1958), Russian mathematician
Gleb Panfilov (born 1934), Russian film director
Gleb Panfyorov (born 1970), Russian football player
Gleb Pavlovsky (born 1951), Russian political scientist
Gleb Pisarevskiy (born 1976), Russian weightlifter
Gleb Sakharov (born 1988), French tennis player
Gleb Savchenko (born 1984), Russian dancer
Gleb Savinov (1915–2000), Russian painter
Gleb Shishmaryov (1781–1835), Russian admiral
Gleb Shulpyakov (born 1971), Russian writer
Gleb Strizhenov (1923–1985), Russian actor
Gleb Struve (1898–1985), Russian poet and literary historian
Gleb Svyatoslavich (Prince of Chernigov) (1168–1215), Rus' prince
Gleb Uspensky (1843–1902), Russian writer
Gleb Wataghin (1899–1986), Italian scientist
Gleb Yakunin (1934–2014), Russian priest and dissident
Gleb Veselov (born 1991), Slovak rapper born in Pjatigorsk, Russia
Gleb Nikolaevskii (born 2008), Russian-born starting VFX artist

Fictional characters
Gleb Nerzhin, leading character, mathematician, prisoner, and Solzhenitsyn's alter ego in In the First Circle; Solzhenitsyn also uses Nerzhin in some of his writings about his experiences in World War II
Gleb, a female character in the 2017 video game Star Wars Battlefront II
Gleb Vaganov, main antagonist in 2017 musical Anastasia (musical)
Gleb Zhiglov, main character in 1979 Soviet mini-series The Meeting Place Cannot Be Changed

See also
Boris Gleb, village in Murmansk, Russia
Church of Boris and Gleb, Russia
Saints Boris and Gleb

References

Russian masculine given names
Ukrainian masculine given names